The following is a timeline of key developments of algebra :

See also

References

History of algebra
Algebra